Okakarara is a town in Otjozondjupa Region, Namibia, located  southeast of Waterberg National Park. It has an estimated population of 7,000 and is currently growing by 1,500 inhabitants annually.

Okakarara consists of the residential areas of Pamue, the former whites-only area, and Okakarara Proper, the former black residential area. It is the district capital of the Okakarara electoral constituency that includes surrounding settlements.

History 
The first house was built by Salathiel Kambamba Kambazembi and Reinard Tjerije who arrived in the area in 1923. The settlement grew over time and was proclaimed a town in 1992. Okakarara became the centre of the Herero Tribal Authority in the early 1970s.

Economy and infrastructure
The town further features a secondary school, a government hospital, a vocational training centre, and an abattoir.

Since 2007, Okakarara hosts the annual Okakarara trade fair, a four-day event to bring the breeders of the communal land area around the town together to showcase the animals, as well as share ideas on how they can help improve farming methods. This initiative also led to the erection of a trade centre and an SME park.

Politics

Local authority elections
Okakarara is governed by a town council that has seven seats. Formerly part of the Apartheid-era bantustan Hereroland, the area is still mainly populated by the Herero people. Because of this, Okakarara is one of the few towns in Namibia where the otherwise dominant SWAPO party faces considerable opposition.

In the 2004 elections, SWAPO came only second, and the Herero-dominated National Unity Democratic Organisation (NUDO) won. Due to a very unusual coalition between SWAPO and Democratic Turnhalle Alliance (DTA), the then elected town mayor Ehrnst Katjiku had SWAPO affiliation. The 2015 local authority election was again won by NUDO which gained three seats and 842 votes. SWAPO came second with 538 votes and gained two seats, and the DTA also gained two seats with 483 votes. NUDO also won the 2020 local authority election. It obtained 642 votes and gained two seats. Also at two seats each were the Popular Democratic Movement (PDM, the new name of the DTA) with 535 votes and SWAPO with 375 votes. The remaining seat went to the Landless People's Movement (LPM, an opposition party formed in 2016) with 365 votes.

Mayors

 2010 – 2012 MZ Tjiho (DTA)
 2013 – 2015 John Viakondo
 2016 – 2018 Olga Tjiurutue (PDM)
 2018 – present Veundjua Kamutuezu

Twin towns
Okakarara has twinning agreements with the following Namibian towns:

 Grootfontein
 Ongwediva
 Otjiwarongo
 Outapi
 Outjo
 Rehoboth
 Tsumeb
 Windhoek

Notable residents
 Zedekia Ngavirue, diplomat
 Ngarikutuke Tjiriange, former Namibian Minister of Justice

In popular culture
Okakarara is named as the venue for the "ECACL conference" that Ann Taylor has the honour of attending in the 1989 film The Gods Must Be Crazy II.

References

Populated places in the Otjozondjupa Region
Towns in Namibia